Gymnopilus luteocarneus is a species of mushroom-forming fungus in the family Hymenogastraceae.

Description

Habitat and distribution
Gymnopilus luteocarneus grows solitary to scattered, on conifer logs. It has been found in California in November.

See also

List of Gymnopilus species

References

luteocarneus
Fungi of North America
Fungi described in 1969
Taxa named by Lexemuel Ray Hesler